José Manuel Pérez Rodríguez (born 24 May 1985) is a Spanish footballer who plays as a left back.

Club career
Born in Seville, Andalusia, Pérez graduated from local Sevilla FC's youth system, making his senior debuts with the C-team in the 2004–05 season, in Tercera División. Two years later he first featured with the reserves, being promoted from Segunda División B, and on 11 November 2007 played his first game as a professional, starting in a 1–0 away win against CD Numancia in the Segunda División.

On 28 January 2009 Pérez joined Lucena CF, also in the third division. He then continued his career in the same category but also in the fourth level, representing CD Alcalá, Sporting Villanueva Promesas and Racing de Ferrol, achieving promotion to division three with the latter in 2013 by appearing in 32 matches and scoring once.

On 14 July 2014, Pérez moved to Cultural y Deportiva Leonesa.

References

External links

1985 births
Living people
Footballers from Seville
Spanish footballers
Association football defenders
Segunda División players
Segunda División B players
Tercera División players
Sevilla FC C players
Sevilla Atlético players
Lucena CF players
CD Alcalá players
Racing de Ferrol footballers
Cultural Leonesa footballers
Burgos CF footballers